Bartered may refer to:

Barter, a method of exchanging or trading by which goods or services are directly exchanged for other goods or services without using a medium of exchange
The Bartered Bride, an 1866 comic opera by Bedřich Smetana
The Bartered Bride discography
The Bartered Bride (1932 film), 1932 German film directed by Max Ophüls based on the comic opera

See also
Barter (disambiguation)
Bride-buying